Mammendorf is a municipality in Bavaria, Germany. It is located halfway between Munich and Augsburg.

Location

Mammendorf is part of the district of Fürstenfeldbruck, Upper Bavaria and lies about 6 kilometres northwest of the city of Fürstenfeldbruck. The towns Nannhofen and Peretshofen are part of the municipality of Mammendorf.

Geography

The Maisach River flows through Mammendorf.

Transport

Mammendorf-Nannhofen is the last station of the Munich S-Bahn line S3, as well as the terminus of the R1 line of Augsburg's transport system, Augsburger Verkehrsverbund (AVV).

Notable people
Gerhard Merz, artist

References

Fürstenfeldbruck (district)